Mint is an Indian financial daily newspaper published by HT Media, a Delhi-based media group which is controlled by the K. K. Birla family that also publishes Hindustan Times. It mostly targets readers who are business executives and policy makers. It has been in circulation since 2007.

Of the five business dailies published in India, Mint rose to the number two position immediately after its launch and has remained there (behind The Economic Times ever since. It publishes a single national edition that is printed and distributed in New Delhi, Mumbai, Bangalore, Hyderabad, Chennai, Kolkata, Pune, Ahmedabad and Chandigarh. Unlike most mainstream newspapers from India, Mint is not published on Sunday. It instead offers its readers Mint Lounge every Saturday, a weekend magazine focused on intelligent lifestyle, fashion, food, books, science and culture.

Mint's editorial coverage and its style of presentation is noted for its refreshing clarity and accessibility - facets that were uncommon in business journalism from India. Shortly after its launch and in years thereafter, competitors continued to imitate Mint's innovations.

It is India's first newspaper to be published in the Berliner format. The former editor of the Wall Street Journal India, Raju Narisetti was the founding editor of Mint until he stepped down in 2008. Narisetti was succeeded by Sukumar Ranganathan, who served as editor till 2017.

In 2014, Mint and the Journal ended their seven-year editorial partnership 

In 2017, former editor of Khaleej Times Vinay Kamat was appointed as Editor, replacing Sukumar Ranganathan.

In November 2020, Sruthijith Kurupichankandy, better known as SK, was appointed Editor-in-chief.

History

Launch
Mint began in collaboration with The Wall Street Journal on 1 February 2007, with the Journals former deputy managing editor, Raju Narisetti as its founding editor.

Relaunch
In 2016, Mint changed from the Berliner format it popularized in India and became a broadsheet. Mint also publishes Mint Lounge as a Saturday cultural edition.

Website
After struggling in the initial years, the Livemint website is now the second most read business news website in India, behind The Economic Times. After HT Media Limited acquired VCCircle from News Corp in 2020, the Livemint website also shares content with the VCCircle and TechCircle websites. The three websites have sort of become one product, though they still operate independently as well. The Deals, Tech and Startups page on the Mint newspaper routinely gets content from both VCCircle and TechCircle.

Notable employees (past and present)
 Niranjan Rajadyaksha
 Anil Padmanabhan
 Tamal Bandyopadhyay
 Melissa Bell
 Mitra Kalita
 Samanth Subramanian
 Sidin Vadukut, columnist, previously managing editor of livemint.com
 Liz Mathew
 Sanjiv Shankaran
 Jacob Koshy
 Padmaparna Ghosh
 Utpal Bhaskar
 Asit Ranjan Mishra
 Prashant K Nanda
 Seema Chowdhry
 Priya Ramani
 Anindhita Ghose
 Shalini Umachandran
 Cordelia Jenkins
 PR Sanjai
 Mobis Philipose
 Jose Martin Tharakan
 Anil Penna
 Nabeel Mohideen
 Monika Halan

References

External links
   
 Mint ePaper (E-Paper – Digital Replica of the newspaper) 
 Interview with Raju Narisetti, Mint
 Mint Market Info (Money Mint Market Information) 
  
 

2007 establishments in Delhi
Business newspapers published in India
English-language newspapers published in India
Hindustan Times
National newspapers published in India
Newspapers published in Delhi
Publications established in 2007